Simulia (Sl. No.: 42) is a Vidhan Sabha constituency of Balasore district, Odisha.

Area of this constituency includes Simulia block and Khaira block.

In 2009 election, Biju Janata Dal candidate Parsuram Panigrahi defeated Indian National Congress candidate Padma Lochan Panda by a margin of 10,927 votes.

Elected Members
14 elections held during 1951 to 2014. Elected members from the Simulia constituency are:
2019: (42): Jyoti Prakash Panigrahi (BJD)
2014: (41): Jyoti Prakash Panigrahi (BJD)
2009: (41): Parsuram Panigrahi (BJD)
2004: (16): Padma Lochan Panda (Congress)
2000: (16): Parsuram Panigrahi (BJD)
1995: (16): Padma Lochan Panda (Congress)
1990: (16): Parsuram Panigrahi (Janata Dal)
1985: (16): Padma Lochan Panda (Congress)
1980: (16): Parsuram Panigrahi (JNP (JP))
1977: (16): Gopinath Das (Janata Party)
1974: (16): Sailen Mohapatra (Congress)
1971: (17): Chintamani Jena(Communist)
1967: (17): Utsav Charan Jena (PSP)
1961: (125): Bhagirathi Das (Congress)
1951: (31): Bisi Bibhar (Congress)

2014 Election Result
In 2014 election, Biju Janata Dal candidate Jyoti Prakash Panigrahi defeated Indian National Congress candidate Padmalochan Panda by a margin of 7,937 votes.

Summary of results of the 2009 Election

Notes

References

Assembly constituencies of Odisha
Balasore district